The Half-Breed is a 1916 film directed by Allan Dwan. It stars Douglas Fairbanks as Lo ("Sleeping Water") Dorman a man competing for the love of the local preacher's daughter (Jewel Carmen) with the local sheriff (Sam De Grasse). The audience, however, are informed that Sheriff Dunn is actually Lo's father.

Monica Nolan has suggested that the film follows the "common strategy of exposing racism and then evading a real confrontation with its consequences" by arranging for Lo to meet a more worthy (and politically acceptable) love interest,  Teresa (Alma Rubens), "who, as both a Mexican and an outlaw, is his social equal."

The film was shot at in Sequoia National Park and near Santa Cruz, California.

Prints and/or fragments were found in the Dawson Film Find in 1978.

Cast
Douglas Fairbanks as Lo Dorman
Alma Rubens as Teresa
Sam De Grasse as Sheriff Dunn
Tom Wilson as Dick Curson
Frank Brownlee as Winslow Wynn
Jewel Carmen as Nellie
George Beranger as Jack Brace

References

External links
 The Half-Breed at IMDb.com

Full restored film

1916 films
1916 drama films
Silent American drama films
American silent feature films
American black-and-white films
Films directed by Allan Dwan
Films shot in California
1910s American films